The Arabian leaf-toed gecko (Hemidactylus homoeolepis) is a species of gecko. It is found in the southern Arabian Peninsula (Saudi Arabia, Yemen, and Oman) and the island of Socotra.

References

Hemidactylus
Reptiles of the Middle East
Reptiles of the Arabian Peninsula
Fauna of Socotra
Reptiles described in 1881
Taxa named by William Thomas Blanford